Ministry of Croatian Veterans (MHB) is a ministry of the Croatian Government which is split into several directorates:

Directorate for Family
This directorate is further split up into departments for family, children and youth and people with disabilities.
Directorate for War Veterans
This directorate deals with laws relating to Croatian veterans of the nation's Homeland War. These relate to the veterans' rights and their state of health, among other things. The directorate also operates services such as a phone-in line for veterans and scholarships for their children.
Directorate for Intergenerational Solidarity
This directorate safeguards the rights of citizens over 65 years of age.
Directorate for the Imprisoned and Missing
This directorate's purpose is to find the imprisoned and missing from the Homeland War, as well as to exhume and identify the remains of victims of the war.

The current Minister of Croatian Veterans' affairs is Tomo Medved of the Croatian Democratic Union (HDZ).

List of ministers

Notes
 nb 1.   Served as Minister of Family, Veterans' Affairs and Inter-generational Solidarity

References

External links 
 

Veterans' Affairs
Croatia
1997 establishments in Croatia